Toxiclionella is a genus of sea snails, marine gastropod mollusks in the family Clavatulidae.

The species in this genus were split off from the genus Clavatula by Powell in 1966 because of the toxoglossate dentition in the radula of the type species Clavatula tumida.

Species
Species within the genus Toxiclionella include:
 Toxiclionella haliplex (Bartsch, 1915)
 Toxiclionella impages (Adams & Reeve, 1848)
 Toxiclionella tumida (Sowerby II, 1870)
Species brought into synonymy
 Toxiclionella elstoni (Barnard, 1962): synonym of Caliendrula elstoni (Barnard, 1962)

References